Bingham was a historical community in Dillon County, South Carolina, in operation 1892 to 1941.

Selkirk Farm was listed on the National Register of Historic Places in 1974.

Sources

Stokes, Durward T. The History of Dillon County, South Carolina. Columbia, S.C.: University of South Carolina Press, 1978. p460
Bingham, South Carolina. Geographic Names Information System, U.S. Geological Survey.

Populated places in Dillon County, South Carolina
Former populated places in South Carolina
Populated places established in 1892
Populated places disestablished in 1941